Asitha Ameresekere (born 24 June 1971) is a British-Sri Lankan Filmmaker and Writer.

Ameresekere was born in London, and was educated at the Overseas Children's School in Sri Lanka, Harrow School in London and read Classics at Bristol University. Ameresekere received an MFA in Directing for Theatre, Video & Cinema at the California Institute of the Arts.

Ameresekere's short film Do Not Erase won Best Short Film at the 60th British Academy Film Awards (BAFTA). Ameresekere is currently in the development stage of his next short film, in addition to writing two feature films and a novella.

A collection of Ameresekere's short stories Wedding Gifts & Other Presents will be published in May 2007 by Perera-Hussein Books in Colombo, Sri Lanka.

Asitha Ameresekere lives and works in London.

Filmography  
14 - short film, 9 mins (2009)
Do Not Erase - short film, 29 mins (2005) 
in sight - short film, 17 mins (2003)

External links 
 BBC News Article
 Sunday Times Article
 Daily Mirror News Article
 in sight Website

1971 births
Living people
People educated at Harrow School
Alumni of the University of Bristol
California Institute of the Arts alumni
BAFTA winners (people)
British experimental filmmakers